Walker Douglas Little (born April 1, 1999) is an American football offensive tackle for the Jacksonville Jaguars of the National Football League (NFL). He played college football at Stanford, and was drafted by the Jaguars in the second round of the 2021 NFL Draft.

Early life and college
Little was born in Houston, Texas, on April 1, 1999. He played high school football as an offensive tackle at Episcopal in Bellaire, Texas, where he was a consensus five-star prospect. He was recruited by over 30 colleges before committing to Stanford University in 2017 to play college football for the Cardinal. He was the first true freshman to start at left tackle for Stanford since Kirk Chambers in 2000 and was named the co-recipient of the Pac-12 Freshman Offensive Player of the Year award. He started every game in 2018 and earned All-Pac-12 first-team honors. The following year Little suffered a knee injury (torn MPFL) against Northwestern and missed the rest of the 2019 season. He decided to return to Stanford for 2020 but later opted out due to the COVID-19 pandemic.

Professional career

Little was selected by the Jacksonville Jaguars in the second round (45th overall) of the 2021 NFL Draft. Jacksonville previously obtained the second round pick after trading Yannick Ngakoue to the Minnesota Vikings. Little signed his four-year rookie contract with Jacksonville on July 20, 2021.

Personal life
Little's grandfather Gene Little played college football at Rice and was selected by the New York Giants in the 18th round of the 1952 NFL Draft, while his uncle Jack Little played college football at Texas A&M and was selected in the fifth round of the 1953 NFL Draft by the Baltimore Colts.

References

External links
 
 Stanford Cardinals bio

Living people
1999 births
American football offensive tackles
Players of American football from Houston
Stanford Cardinal football players
Jacksonville Jaguars players